Roope Nikkilä (born May 2, 1990) is a Finnish professional ice hockey player who is currently playing Scorpions de Mulhouse in the Ligue Magnus in France. He previously played in Liiga for Ilves.

References

External links

1990 births
Étoile Noire de Strasbourg players
Finnish ice hockey forwards
Ilves players
Kiekko-Vantaa players
KOOVEE players
Lempäälän Kisa players
Living people
Scorpions de Mulhouse players
Ice hockey people from Tampere